Courts of New Hampshire include:
;State courts of New Hampshire
New Hampshire Supreme Court
New Hampshire Superior Court
New Hampshire District Court
New Hampshire Family Division
New Hampshire Probate Court

Federal courts located in New Hampshire
United States District Court for the District of New Hampshire

References

External links
National Center for State Courts – directory of state court websites.

Courts in the United States